Demonstration may refer to:
 Demonstration (acting), part of the Brechtian approach to acting
 Demonstration (military), an attack or show of force on a front where a decision is not sought
 Demonstration (political), a political rally or protest
 Demonstration (teaching), a method of teaching by example rather than simple explanation
 Demonstration Hall, a building on the Michigan State University campus
 Mathematical proof
 Product demonstration, a sales or marketing presentation such as a:
 Technology demonstration, an incomplete version of product to showcase idea, performance, method or features of the product
 Scientific demonstration, a scientific experiment to illustrate principles
 Wolfram Demonstrations Project, a repository of computer based educational demonstrations

Music
 Demonstration (Landon Pigg album), 2002
 Demonstration (Tinie Tempah album), 2013
 Demonstrations EP, the first EP by We Came As Romans
 Demonstrate (song), a song by JoJo

Sports
 Demonstration sport, a sport which is played to promote it, most commonly during the Olympic Games
 Exhibition game, a sporting event with no competitive value to any competitor

See also
 Demonstration effect, effects on the behavior of individuals caused by observation of others
 Demonstration farm, a farm which is used primarily to demonstrate agricultural techniques
 Demonstration of force, the show of armed forces and their capabilities
 Demo (disambiguation)